Ataxin-3 is a protein that in humans is encoded by the ATXN3 gene.

Clinical significance 

Machado–Joseph disease, also known as spinocerebellar ataxia-3, is an autosomal dominant neurologic disorder. The protein encoded by the ATXN3 gene contains CAG repeats in the coding region, and the expansion of these repeats from the normal 13-36 to 68-79 is the cause of Machado–Joseph disease. This disorder is thus a trinucleotide repeat disorder type I known as a polyglutamine (PolyQ) disease. There is an inverse correlation between the age of onset and CAG repeat numbers. Alternatively spliced transcript variants encoding different isoforms have been described for this gene.

Interactions 

Ataxin 3 has been shown to interact with:
 RAD23A, 
 RAD23B, and
 VCP.

Model organisms
Model organisms have been used in the study of ATXN3 function. A conditional knockout mouse line called Atxn3tm1a(KOMP)Wtsi was generated at the Wellcome Trust Sanger Institute. Male and female animals underwent a standardized phenotypic screen to determine the effects of deletion. Additional screens performed:  - In-depth immunological phenotyping - in-depth bone and cartilage phenotyping

References

Further reading

External links 
  GeneReviews/NCBI/NIH/UW entry on Spinocerebellar Ataxia Type 3
 

Proteins